The siege of Chittorgarh took place in 1535, when Sultan Bahadur Shah of Gujarat attacked Chittor Fort, after the death of Rana Sanga, with the aim of expanding his kingdom. The forts defense was led by the Widows of Sanga.

Background
Rana Vikramaditya was an unpopular ruler, mainly due to his short temper and arrogance. He had insulted several nobles and courtiers which caused many nobles to leave his court. The Sultan of Gujarat took advantage of this situation and made plans to attack Mewar in 1532, however Rani Karnavati had the siege lifted by paying a ransom. The ransom kept the sultan satisfied for a few years but he once again attacked Mewar in 1534. Upon knowing of the invasion, Rani Karnavati requested the people of Mewar to come to the defense of Chittor. Hundreds of Commoners as well as nobles came to her call of arms, however the Gujarati army still greatly outnumbered the Mewari's.

Siege
The Mewari army was able to fend off attacks till March 1535, after which the Gujarati artillery under Rumi Khan succeeded in breaking through the fort defenses, Rao Doorga, Arjun Hada and the Chundawat brothers were killed after trying to repel the Gujarati assaults. One of Rana Sanga's widow, rani Jawahir Bai Rathor then donned her armour and led the sortie with Mewari soldiers against the Sultan's army, she wreaked havoc on the Gujarati ranks and was killed after inflicting casualties to the enemy. The women of Chittor including Rani Karnavati committed Jauhar and the soldiers prepared for Saka, which was led by Bagh Singh of Deola. Rana Vikramaditya Singh, Udai Singh and Udai Singh's faithful nurse Panna Dai escaped to Bundi. Bahadur Shah was not able to hold Chittor for long and the Sisodia's captured it within a short time of his departure.

The fable about Rani Karnavati sending a rakhi to Humayun was invented later by James Tod and modern historians do not consider it a historical fact.

References 

 Ishwari Prasad. "A Short History of Muslim Rule in India". India in the sixteenth century. The Indian 
 Joe Bindloss; James Bainbridge; Lindsay Brown; Mark Elliott; Stuart Butler (2007). India. Southern Rajasthan History. Lonely Planet.
 Mirat-e-Sikandari pp. 381-382

Chittorgarh
Chittorgarh Fort
Chittorgarh